Sanxi Station, formerly Yuzhu Station during planning, is a station on Line 5 of the Guangzhou Metro. It is located under Huangpu Avenue East near Tangxiachong in the Tianhe District. It opened on 28December 2009.

Station layout

Exits

References

Railway stations in China opened in 2009
Guangzhou Metro stations in Tianhe District